Hakami (also Romanized as Hakamī) is a village in Howmeh Rural District, in the Central District of Minab County, Hormozgan Province, Iran. At the 2006 census, its population was 4,310, in 849 families.

References 

Populated places in Minab County